Bollobás is a Hungarian surname. Notable people with the surname include:

 Béla Bollobás (born 1943, Budapest), Hungarian-born British mathematician
 Enikő Bollobás (born 1952), Hungarian literary scholar

See also
 Bollobás–Riordan polynomial

Hungarian-language surnames